CSCL can refer to:

 Caesium chloride (CsCl), a chemical compound.
 Computer Supported Collaborative Learning, a research topic on supporting collaborative learning with the assistance of computer artifacts.
 China Shipping Container Lines, a containerized marine shipping company, based in Shanghai China.